is a railway station on the Aoimori Railway Line in the town of Nanbu in Aomori Prefecture, Japan, operated by the third sector railway operator Aoimori Railway Company.

Lines
Tomabechi Station is served by the Aoimori Railway Line, and is 18.2 kilometers from the terminus of the line at Metoki Station. It is 635.5 kilometers from Tokyo Station.

Station layout
Tomabechi Station has two ground-level opposed side platforms serving two tracks connected to the station building by a footbridge.  The station is unattended.

Platforms

History
Tomabechi Station was opened on August 15, 1961 as a station of the Tohoku Main Line on the Japan National Railways (JNR). Freight operations were discontinued from April 1962. With the privatization of the JNR on April 1, 1987, it came under the operational control of JR East. It came under the control of the Aoimori Railway Line on December 1, 2002.

Surrounding area

Mabechi River

See also
 List of Railway Stations in Japan

External links

Railway stations in Aomori Prefecture
Aoimori Railway Line
Railway stations in Japan opened in 1961
Nanbu, Aomori